Vermont elected its members September 3, 1816, replacing its six Federalists with six Democratic-Republicans.

See also 
 1816 and 1817 United States House of Representatives elections
 List of United States representatives from Vermont

1816
Vermont
United States House of Representatives